The Late Liz is a 1971 American drama film directed by Dick Ross and written by Bill Rega. It is based on the 1957 book The Late Liz by Gertrude Behanna (pen name Elizabeth Burns). The film stars Anne Baxter, Steve Forrest, James Gregory, Coleen Gray, Joan Hotchkis and Jack Albertson. The film was released on September 22, 1971, by Gateway Films.

Plot

Cast          
Anne Baxter as Liz Addams Hatch
Steve Forrest as Jim Hatch
James Gregory as Sam Burns
Coleen Gray as Sue Webb
Joan Hotchkis as Sally Pearson
Jack Albertson as Gordon Rogers
Eloise Hardt as Laura Valon
Don Lamond as Steve Blake
Buck Young as Logan Pearson
Lee Delano as Joe Vito
Stephen Dunne as Si Addams 
Reid Smith as Alan Trowbridge
William Katt as Peter Addams 
Virginia Capers as Martha
Alvy Moore as Bill Morris
Nancy Hadley as Edie Morris
John Baer as Arthur Bryson
Mark Tapscott as Tony Webb
Larkin Ford as Dr. Robinson
San Christopher as Nurse Eaton
John Craig as Herb Lillis
Gail Bonney as Gladys
Ivor Francis as Dr. Murray
Ann Summers as Sister Ellen
Kathleen Hughes as Elaine Rich
Foster Brooks as Howard Borman
Lani Kai as Manu
Leon Lontoc as Sonny Kalani
Calvert Bothelo as Johnny T
Lorraine Davies as Liz' Mother
Jackson Bostwick as Randall Trowbridge

References

External links
 

1971 films
American drama films
1971 drama films
Films directed by Dick Ross (director)
1970s English-language films
1970s American films